"Keep Holding On" is a 2006 song by Avril Lavigne.
	
Keep Holding On or Just Keep Holding On may also refer to:

Music
"Keep Holding On", song by Ace Spectrum Mel Kent, Ken Williams 1975
"Keep Holding On", song by The Gap Band Lonnie Simmons, Charlie Wilsson, Rudy Taylor, Oliver Scott, Jimmy Hamilton	1986
"Keep Holding On", song by The Temptations	E. Holland, B. Holland 1976

See also
"I’ll Keep Holding On (disambiguation)
"Just Keep Holding On", song by	Sam and Dave	1968